Chaliyar River is the fourth longest river in Kerala at 169 km in length. The Chaliyar is also known as Chulika River, Nilambur River or Beypore River as it nears the sea. Pothukal, Chungathara, Nilambur, Mampad, Edavanna, Kavanoor, Perakamanna, Areekode, Kizhuparamba, Elamaram, Cheekkode, Vazhakkad, Vazhayur, Cheruvadi, Edavannappara, Mavoor, Peruvayal, Feroke and Beypore are some of the towns/villages situated along the banks of Chaliyar. It mainly flows through Malappuram district. Its tributaries flow through both the districts of Malappuram and Kozhikode.  The bank of river Chaliyar at Nilambur region is also known for natural Gold fields. Explorations done at the valley of the river Chaliyar in Nilambur has shown reserves of the order of 2.5 million cubic meters of placers with 0.1 gram per cubic meter of gold. It originates at Ilambaleri hills of Nilgiri Mountains in Nilgiris district (Ooty district), which is also near Wayanad-Malappuram district border. It flows mainly through the erstwhile region of Eranad (present-day Malappuram district), and finally empties into the Arabian Sea at Beypore port, opposite to Chaliyam harbour.

Name

The river has three names - Chaliyar, Nilambur River, and Beypore puzha, of which the first one is more popular. The river meets the Lakshadweep Sea at an 'azhi' (estuary), the southern part of which is known as Chaliyam and northern part as Beypore. Unlike many other rivers in Kerala, Chaliyar does not dry up during the drought season in March and April.

Chaliyar is also the name of a place and a Grama panchayat in Nilambur Taluk, which is located near the Nilambur Municipality, where Conolly's plot, the oldest manmade teak plantation in the world is located.

Course

The Chaliyar originates in the Western Ghats range at Ilambaleri hills in the ranges of Nilgiri Mountains of Western Ghats, which is also near Wayanad-Malappuram district border. Chaliyar flows through Malappuram District for most of its length and then for around 17 km it forms the boundary between Malappuram District and Kozhikode District before entering the city of Kozhikode for its final 10 km journey and finally empties into the Lakshadweep Sea at Beypore. Six major streams Chaliyarpuzha, Punnapuzha, Kanjirapuzha, 
Karimpuzha, Iruvahnipuzha and Thottumukkampuzha constitute the Chaliyar River drainage system. Other important tributaries are Kurumanpuzha, Pandipuzha, Maradipuzha, Kuthirapuzha and Karakkodupuzha. Most of these rivers have their origin in the Nilgiri hills in the east and Wayanad hills in the north, where they form a number of rapids and waterfalls. Near the origin of river are the Meenmutty Falls at coordinates  by Vaduvanchal, Wayanad

Economy
During late 19th century and early 20th century, the Chaliyar was extensively used as a waterway for carrying timber from the forest areas in and around Nilambur to the various mills in Kallai of Calicut city. Rafts made of logs were taken downstream during the monsoon season to Kallayi, where these were sawn to size in the timber mills dotting the banks of the river. Kallai was during this period one of the most important centers in the world for timber business. The place was famous for wood of superlative strength and durability like teak, rosewood, etc. Towards the second half of the 20th century, the activity came down drastically as tree felling was banned or strictly controlled with a view to stop deforestation. Many mills still operate in Kallai, though with far less output. Many have closed down.

Ecology

Chaliyar River was in the news a few years ago because of the ecological damage caused by a pulp factory at Mavoor, that released effluents into the river and affected the marine life. This factory has since closed down.

K. A. Rahman led the agitation for cleanup of the river, and inspired the formation of an anti-pollution committee, Paristhithi Samrakshana Samithi, in 1999.

Tributaries
 Cherupuzha (Mavoor)
Engappuzha
Iruthullippuzha
Kadungampuzha
 Iruvanjippuzha
Pulingappuzha
Chalippuzha
Muthappanpuzha
 Thottumukkampuzha
 Kuthirappuzha
Kottappuzha
 Kuruvanpuzha
 Kanjirappuzha
 Karimpuzha
Cherupuzha (Karulai)
Punnappuzha or Pandiyar
Maruthappuzha or Kalakkanpuzha
Karakkodan puzha
 Pandippuzha
 Neerppuzha

In addition to these rivers some creeks also join Chaliyar from Neelithode, Poonkudi, Vadasseri, Edavanna, Kunduthodu and Mampad.

Tourism 

Elamaram is a village in the Indian state of Kerala.  It is situated near Edavannappara in Malappuram District of Kerala.  This village is very scenic as it is on the bank of Chaliyar.   There is a ferry service here that can take you to the northern side of the Chaliyar river. The ticket is Rs.5.00 and the motor boat service is available every half an hour between 6.40 a.m. and 8.40 p.m. including Sundays.

Ghost Town

Across the river Chaliyar lies the abandoned Grasim Industries factory which once employed 2,000 employees.  Environmental agitations in 1998 caused the closure of the factory and the entire village went bankrupt because of the sudden development and eleven people even committed suicide because of not being able to face unexpected poverty.

Pilgrimage

The Konnara Dargah is three kilometres away from Elamaram on the bank of the Chaliyar river.  It is the holy resting place of a Muslim saint where hundreds of pilgrims visit regularly.

Nearby villages
 Irumooliparamba, Ponnempadam, Channayil Palliyali (Santhigram), Akode, Virippad, Korappadam, Mundumuzhi, Vazhakkad, Valillappuzha, Pancheeri, Elamaram, Mapram, Konnar, Vettathur, Cheruvadikavu, Neerad, Muthuvalloor, Moochikal, Mundakkulam, Muthuparamba, Vettukad, Omanoor, Ponnad, Iruppanthody Karatt Chola Kolambalam Edavannappara, Arappuzha, Cheruvannur.

See also
 Chaliyam
 Beypore
 Feroke
 Kadalundi Bird Sanctuary

References

The River Chaliyar, by M. P. Chandran
About the Rivers of Kerala
K A Rahman

External links

Chaliyar River and Mayladi Bridge Nilambur
News report about the River after the pulp factory was closed.
Life returns to Chaliyar river
Adyanpara waterfalls

Rivers of Kerala
Rivers of the Western Ghats
Rivers of Kozhikode district
Rivers of Malappuram district
Rivers of India